The World Alliance of International Financial Centers (WAIFC) is a non-profit financial association based in Brussels, Belgium. Created in Paris in 2018, its goal is to facilitate mutual cooperation by representing the world's major financial centers.

History
In 2016 the financial centres of Paris, Frankfurt and Moscow proposed the creation of a non-profit association to facilitate cooperation and promote good practice and exchange with international public authorities. Two years later the association was founded as the World Alliance of International Financial Centres in Paris and was registered on October 1, 2018 in the city of Brussels by eleven financial centres from countries such as Germany, France, Belgium, Russia, Canada and the United Arab Emirates.

According to the newspapers Luxemburger Wort and L'Echo, the alliance was created "in order to strengthen collaboration between the centres leading to the development of a dialogue with public authorities based on financial technologies and sustainable development". Arnaud de Bresson, executive director of the Paris Europlace organization, was elected as the first president, while Jochen Biedermann and Frederic de Laminne became managing director and treasurer respectively. In January 2021, Jennifer Reynolds, President & CEO of Toronto Finance International, was elected as the first Chairwoman of the Alliance. The initial eleven members were joined by centers from other territories such as Japan, Hong Kong, Mauritius, Qatar and the United Kingdom to form an 20-member alliance today.

In view of the contingency generated by the COVID-19 pandemic in 2020, the association expressed in a publication the need to "reconsider economic models and give a new priority to long-term prospects and sustainable economy". Board member Hubertus Väth cited the financial centers of Tokyo and Hong Kong as examples for "successfully dealing with similar challenges in the past," referring to the 2002–2004 SARS outbreak. The text also called for concentrated efforts to develop technologies such as blockchain, artificial intelligence and cloud computing to address contingency challenges.

Overall focus
WAIFC was created to bringing international financial centres under one organization to facilitate mutual cooperation, encourage the exchange of best practices, stimulate financial research and undertake projects that contribute to sustainable economic development. Currently the organization is in charge of conducting research projects with universities and private consulting companies, focusing on areas of action such as the development of financial technologies or fintech, data collection from financial centers and their contribution to green investment.

Members
The World Alliance of International Financial Centres consists of the following centres and institutions:

Source:

References

External links

International economic organizations
Organizations established in 2018